The Head of the OCHA Office in Central African Republic is the highest post in the tiny African country for the United Nations Office for the Coordination of Humanitarian Affairs, nevertheless a key post in light of the country's current humanitarian emergency.

List of Heads of the OCHA Office in CAR 

 Souleymane Beye, May 2005 - December 2006
 Jean-Sebastien Munie, January 2007 - present

History of the Central African Republic
United Nations posts